The Israel Shooting Federation (התאחדות הקליעה בישראל) is the Israeli association for shooting sports affiliated to the International Shooting Sport Federation and the International Practical Shooting Confederation.

References 

Regions of the International Practical Shooting Confederation
Sports organizations of Israel
National members of the European Shooting Confederation